The Hunsrück Slate is a Lower Devonian lithostratigraphic unit, a type of rock strata, in the German regions of the Hunsrück and Taunus. It is a lagerstätte famous for exceptional preservation of a highly diverse fossil fauna assemblage.

Geology
The Emsian stratigraphy of the southern Rhenish Massif can be divided into two lithological units: the older slates of the Hunsrück-Schiefer and the younger sandstones of the Singhofener Schichten. Stratigraphically below the Hunsrück Slates is the (older) Taunus quartzite. All these metasedimentary rocks were originally deposited in the marine Rhenohercynian Basin, a back-arc basin south of the paleocontinent of Laurussia.

The Hunsrück Slate roughly comprises the Sauerthal-Schichten, Bornich-Schichten and Kaub-Schichten. These are 408–400 Mya old, making them part of the Latest Pragian to Early Emsian stages of the Devonian.

History of mining
The Hunsrück slate was a source for Rhenish slate over several centuries. Archaeological finds in West Germany show that the slate was used in Roman times. The first documented case of mining in this area dates from the 14th century. The production continued with the Industrial Revolution at the end of the 1700s, but in 1846–49, the industry fell into crisis, resulting in poverty and misery in the mining areas.

The economic upturn after the Franco-Prussian War of 1870-71 resulted in a renewed increase in slate production, where companies used more extensive pits. Production continued until the 1960s, when the competition from cheaper synthetic or imported slate resulted in production decline. Only a single pit in the Bundenbach region was worked in the 1990s. Since 1999, slate imports from Spain, Portugal, Argentina and China caused the abandonment of local mining.

Mining of Hunsrück slate was important for the discovery of fossils. Although not rare, fossils can only be found through extensive mining of slate. Many of the fine fossils exhibited in museums today were originally found by the slate miners. The first scientific publication on these fossils comes from Ferdinand von Roemer (1862), who described starfish and crinoid fossils from Bundenbach. German paleontologists such as R. Opitz, F. Broili, R. Judge, and W. M. Lehmann studied many fossils between 1920 and 1959. Lehmann's death in 1959 and the decline of the slate industry caused a decline in fossil research.

In 1970, Wilhelm Stürmer, a chemical physicist and radiologist at Siemens, developed a new method to examine the Hunsrück slate fossils using medium energy X-rays of 25-40 keV. He created high-resolution movies and stereoscopic images of unopened slates, which showed complex details of soft tissues that cannot be made visible with conventional methods. In the 1990s, Christoph Bartels and Günther Brassel have continued this work.

Paleontology
The various fossil localities are quarries located mostly south of the River Mosel and west of the Rhine in western Germany. The biota of the Hunsrück Slate are commonly called "Bundenbach fossils" after the nearby German community of Bundenbach. More formally, the Hunsruck Slate is properly designated as a Konservat Lagerstätte due to the many fossils that exhibit preservation of soft tissues.

Preservation and taphonomy 
Hunsrück is one of the few marine Devonian Lagerstätte having soft tissue preservation, and in many cases fossils are coated by a pyritic surface layer. Preservation of soft tissues as fossils normally requires rapid burial in an anoxic (i.e., with little or no oxygen) sedimentary layer where the decomposition of the organic matter is significantly slowed. The pyritization found in Bundenbach fossils facilitated preservation and enhanced the inherent beauty of the fossils.

Pyritization is rare in the fossil record, and is believed to require not only rapid burial, but both burial in sediments low in organic matter, and high in concentrations of sulfur and iron. Such pyritization is also prevalent in the lower Cambrian fossils from the Maotianshan shales of Chengjiang, China, the oldest Konservat Lagerstätte of Cambrian time.

The best localities for exceptionally preserved fossils are in the communities of Bundenbach and Gemünden. The slates were widely quarried in the past, mainly for roofing tiles from small pits, of which over 600 are known. Today, only a single quarry remains open in the main fossiliferous region of Bundenbach. There are also areas of the Hunsrück Slates where fossils are neither well preserved, nor pyritized, indicating that there also existed environments with shallow and fully oxygenated water.

Diversity of fauna 
More than 260 animal species have been described from the Hunsrück Slate. The deposits occur in a strip some 15 km wide and 150 km long running from northwest to southeast. In the main depositional basins of Kaub, Bundenbach, and Gemünden, echinoderms are concentrated in the southwestern area around Bundenbach, with brachiopods predominating in the northeast. The presence of corals and trilobites with well-developed eyes and the rarity of plant fossils from the central basin areas suggest a shallow-water environment. Other animal fossils include sponges, corals, brachiopods, cephalopods, ctenophores, cnidarians, gastropods, and worm trace fossils. Trilobites and echinoderms are relatively abundant in some horizons. Crinoids and starfish are the predominant representatives of the echinoderms, although holothurians (sea cucumbers) are also represented. More than 60 species of crinoids are described from the Hunsrück Slate.

Many types of fishes have been described from the Hunsruck slate. Several genera of placoderm armoured fish have been recorded, including some preserved in three dimensions. Agnathan jawless fishes are the most commonly preserved vertebrates, particularly the flattened Drepanaspis, notable for its upwards-facing mouth, and the streamlined Pteraspis. Spines from acanthodii spiny sharks and a single sarcopterygian lobe-fin specimen are also known.

Paleobiota

Arthropods

Echinoderms

Annelids

Molluscs

Brachiopods

Vertebrates

Other animals

Ichnotaxon

Plants

Fungi

See also 
 List of fossil sites (with link directory)

References 

Geologic formations of Germany
Devonian System of Europe
Devonian Germany
Emsian Stage
Pragian Stage
Slate formations
Lagerstätten
Paleontology in Germany
 

de:Hunsrück#Geologie